The 2022 ATP Tour was the global elite men's professional tennis circuit organised by the Association of Tennis Professionals (ATP) for the 2022 tennis season. The 2022 ATP Tour calendar comprised the Grand Slam tournaments (supervised by the International Tennis Federation (ITF)), the ATP Finals, the ATP Tour Masters 1000, the ATP Cup, the ATP 500 series and the ATP 250 series. Also included in the 2022 calendar were the Davis Cup (organised by the ITF), Wimbledon, the Next Gen ATP Finals, and Laver Cup, none of which distributed ranking points. As part of international sports' reaction to the Russian invasion of Ukraine, the ATP, the WTA (Women's Tennis Association), the ITF, and the four Grand Slam tournaments jointly announced on 1 March that players from Belarus and Russia would not be allowed to play in tournaments under the names or flags of their countries, but would remain eligible to play events until further notice. On 20 May 2022, the ATP, ITF, and WTA announced that ranking points would not be awarded for Wimbledon, due to the All England Club's decision to prohibit players from Belarus or Russia from participating in the tournament.

Schedule 
This was the schedule of events on the 2022 calendar.

January

February

March

April

May

June

July

August

September

October

November

Affected tournaments

Statistical information 
These tables present the number of singles (S), doubles (D), and mixed doubles (X) titles won by each player and each nation during the season, within all the tournament categories of the 2022 calendar : the Grand Slam tournaments, the ATP Finals, the ATP Tour Masters 1000, the ATP Tour 500 tournaments, and the ATP Tour 250 tournaments. The players/nations are sorted by:
 Total number of titles (a doubles title won by two players representing the same nation counts as only one win for the nation);
 Cumulated importance of those titles (one Grand Slam win equalling two Masters 1000 wins, one undefeated ATP Finals win equalling one-and-a-half Masters 1000 win, one Masters 1000 win equalling two 500 events wins, one 500 event win equalling two 250 events wins);
 A singles > doubles > mixed doubles hierarchy;
 Alphabetical order (by family names for players).

Titles won by player

Titles won by nation

Titles information 
The following players won their first main circuit title in singles, doubles or mixed doubles:
Singles
  Thanasi Kokkinakis – Adelaide 2 (draw)
  Alexander Bublik – Montpellier (draw)
  Félix Auger-Aliassime – Rotterdam (draw)
  Pedro Martínez – Santiago (draw)
  Holger Rune – Munich (draw)
  Sebastián Báez – Estoril (draw)
  Tim van Rijthoven – 's-Hertogenbosch (draw)
  Francisco Cerúndolo – Båstad (draw)
  Maxime Cressy – Newport (draw)
  Lorenzo Musetti – Hamburg (draw)
  Brandon Nakashima – San Diego (draw)
  Marc-Andrea Hüsler – Sofia (draw)

Doubles
  Ramkumar Ramanathan – Adelaide 1 (draw)
  Denys Molchanov – Marseille (draw)
  Stefanos Tsitsipas – Acapulco (draw)
  Max Purcell – Houston (draw)
  Nuno Borges – Estoril (draw)
  Francisco Cabral – Estoril (draw)
  Pedro Martínez – Kitzbühel (draw)
  Miomir Kecmanović – Los Cabos (draw)
  Nathaniel Lammons – San Diego (draw)
  Mackenzie McDonald – Tokyo (draw)
  Tallon Griekspoor – Antwerp (draw)
  Botic van de Zandschulp – Antwerp (draw)

Mixed doubles
  Wesley Koolhof – French Open (draw)
  John Peers – US Open (draw)

The following players defended a main circuit title in singles, doubles, or mixed doubles:
Singles
  Stefanos Tsitsipas – Monte-Carlo (draw)
  Casper Ruud – Geneva (draw), Gstaad (draw)
  Matteo Berrettini – Queen's Club (draw)
  Novak Djokovic – Wimbledon Championships (draw)

Doubles
  Kevin Krawietz – Munich (draw)
  Nikola Mektić – Rome (draw), Eastbourne (draw)
  Mate Pavić – Rome (draw), Eastbourne (draw)
  William Blumberg – Newport (draw)
  Rajeev Ram – US Open (draw)
  Joe Salisbury – US Open (draw)
  Jan Zieliński – Moselle Open (draw)

Mixed doubles
  Neal Skupski – Wimbledon Championships (draw)

Best ranking 
The following players achieved their career high ranking in this season inside top 50 (in bold the players who entered the top 10 or became the world No. 1 for the first time):

 Singles 

  Matteo Berrettini (reached place No. 6 on January 31)
  James Duckworth (reached place No. 46 on January 31)
  Aslan Karatsev (reached place No. 14 on February 7)
  Alexander Bublik (reached place No. 30 on February 21)
  Daniil Medvedev (reached place No. 1 on February 28)
  Reilly Opelka (reached place No. 17 on February 28)
  Ilya Ivashka (reached place No. 41 on March 7)
  Alejandro Davidovich Fokina (reached place No. 27 on April 18)
  Pedro Martínez (reached place No. 42 on April 25)
  Sebastian Korda (reached place No. 30 on May 2)
  Marcos Giron (reached place No. 49 on May 16)
  Alex Molčan (reached place No. 38 on May 23)
  Alexander Zverev (reached place No. 2 on June 13)
  Jenson Brooksby (reached place No. 33 on June 13)
  Oscar Otte (reached place No. 36 on June 27)
  Benjamin Bonzi (reached place No. 44 on July 18)
  Francisco Cerúndolo (reached place No. 24 on July 25)
  Sebastián Báez (reached place No. 31 on August 1)
  Tallon Griekspoor (reached place No. 44 on August 1)
  Mackenzie McDonald (reached place No. 48 on August 1)
  Maxime Cressy (reached place No. 31 on August 8)
  Botic van de Zandschulp (reached place No. 22 on August 29)
  Carlos Alcaraz (reached place No. 1 on September 12)
  Casper Ruud (reached place No. 2 on September 12)
  Cameron Norrie (reached place No. 8 on September 12)
  Tommy Paul (reached place No. 28 on September 26)
  Taylor Fritz (reached place No. 8 on October 10)
  Frances Tiafoe (reached place No. 17 on October 10)
  Brandon Nakashima (reached place No. 43 on October 17)
  Lorenzo Musetti (reached place No. 23 on October 24)
  Miomir Kecmanović (reached place No. 28 on October 24)
  Arthur Rinderknech (reached place No. 42 on October 31)
  Félix Auger-Aliassime (reached place No. 6 on November 7)
  Holger Rune (reached place No. 10 on November 7)
  Yoshihito Nishioka (reached place No. 36 on November 7)
  Jack Draper (reached place No. 41 on November 7)
  Emil Ruusuvuori (reached place No. 40 on November 21)

 Doubles 

  Matthew Ebden (reached place No. 24 on January 31)
  Ariel Behar (reached place No. 39 on January 31)
  Santiago González (reached place No. 22 on March 21)
  Andrés Molteni (reached place No. 31 on March 21)
  Joe Salisbury (reached place No. 1 on April 4)
  Max Purcell (reached place No. 25 on April 11)
  Andrey Golubev (reached place No. 21 on May 16)
  Tomislav Brkić (reached place No. 37 on May 23)
  Hubert Hurkacz (reached place No. 30 on June 13)
  John Isner (reached place No. 14 on July 18)
  Matwé Middelkoop (reached place No. 22 on July 25)
  Michael Venus (reached place No. 6 on August 29)
  Tim Pütz (reached place No. 7 on August 29)
  Francisco Cabral (reached place No. 45 on September 12)
  Rajeev Ram (reached place No. 1 on October 3)
  Wesley Koolhof (reached place No. 1 on November 7)
  Austin Krajicek (reached place No. 9 on November 7)
  Nick Kyrgios (reached place No. 11 on November 7)
  David Vega Hernández (reached place No. 31 on November 7)
  Jan Zielinski (reached place No. 34 on November 7)
  Nathaniel Lammons (reached place No. 45 on November 7)
  Alexander Erler (reached place No. 47 on November 7)
  Neal Skupski (reached place No. 1 on November 14)
  Marcelo Arévalo (reached place No. 5 on November 14)
  Rafael Matos (reached place No. 27 on November 14)
  Jackson Withrow (reached place No. 47 on November 14)
  Harri Heliövaara (reached place No. 11 on November 21)
  Lloyd Glasspool (reached place No. 12 on November 21)
  Thanasi Kokkinakis (reached place No. 15 on November 21)

ATP rankings 
Below are the tables for the yearly ATP Race rankings and the ATP rankings of the top 20 singles players, doubles players, and doubles teams.

Singles

No. 1 ranking

Doubles

No. 1 ranking

Point distribution 
Points are awarded as follows:

Prize money leaders

Best matches by ATPTour.com

Best 5 Grand Slam tournament matches

Best 5 ATP Tour matches

Retirements 
The following is a list of notable players (winners of a main tour title, and/or part of the ATP rankings top 100 in singles, or top 100 in doubles, for at least one week) who announced their retirement from professional tennis, became inactive (after not playing for more than 52 weeks), or were permanently banned from playing, during the 2022 season:

  Kevin Anderson (born 18 May 1986 in Johannesburg, South Africa) joined the professional tour in 2007 and was ranked as high as world No. 5, won seven singles titles on the ATP Tour, and twice was a major finalist, at the 2017 US Open and the 2018 Wimbledon Championships. He played his final professional match in the first round of the Miami Open which he lost.
  Ruben Bemelmans (born 14 January 1988 in Genk, Belgium) joined the professional tour in 2006 and reached a career-high ranking of No. 84 in singles in September 2015 and no. 128 in doubles in October 2012. He won one title in doubles. He played his last singles professional match in the qualifying draw at the Antwerp Open.
  Rogério Dutra Silva (born 3 February 1984 in São Paulo, Brazil) joined the professional tour in 2003 and reached a career-high ranking of No. 63 in singles in July 2017, and No. 84 in doubles, in February 2018. He won one title in doubles. He played his last match at the Rio Open in the doubles tournament.
  Jonathan Erlich  (born 5 April 1977 in Tel Aviv, Israel) announced his retirement after his participation at the 2022 Tel Aviv Open in September. He turned pro in 1996 and won 22 doubles titles on the ATP Tour.

  Roger Federer (born 8 August 1981 in Basel, Switzerland) joined the professional tour in 1998 and reached a career-high ranking of No. 1 in singles in February 2004, and No. 24 in doubles, in June 2003. He won 103 titles in singles, including 20 major titles. He played his last match in doubles at the Laver Cup.
  Alejandro González (born  7 February 1989 in Medellín, Colombia),  joined the professional tour in 2010 and reached a career-high ranking of No. 70 in singles, in June 2014 and of No. 177 in doubles, in August 2010. In March he played his last match at the Pereira Challenger in the singles tournament, where he lost in the second round.
  Dominic Inglot (born 6 March 1986 in London, England) turned pro in 2004 and won 14 doubles titles and reached No. 18 in the rankings. Announced his retirement in March 2022.
  Ivo Karlović  (born 28 February 1979 in Zagreb, Yugoslavia) turned pro in 2000 and won eight singles and two doubles titles on the ATP Tour. He played his last match at the 2021 US Open.
   Philipp Kohlschreiber (born 16 October 1983 in Augsburg, Germany) joined the professional tour in 2002 and reached a career-high ranking of No. 16 in singles, in July 2012. He won eight singles titles and made 68 Grand Slam main draw appearances. He retired from professional tennis after losing the second round match of the Wimbledon qualifying tournament.
  Lukáš Lacko  (born 3 November 1987)  announced in October, that 2022 will be his last season.
  Marc López (born 31 July 1982 in Barcelona, Spain) joined the professional tour in 1999 and reached a career-high ranking of No. 106 in singles in May 2004, and of No. 3 in doubles in January 2013. He won 14 titles in doubles, including the 2016 French Open. He won a gold medal for Spain in doubles at the 2016 Olympic Games. His anticipated final appearance came at the Barcelona Open, where he and long-time partner Feliciano López defeated the world No. 1 team of Joe Salisbury and Rajeev Ram. However, he received an additional wildcard for the Madrid Open to partner with Carlos Alcaraz in doubles, where he lost in the second round.
  David Marrero (born 8 April 1980 in Las Palmas, Spain) joined the professional tour in 2001, winning 14 titles and reaching a career-high doubles ranking of World No. 5 in November 2013. He retired at the Barcelona Open, where he played his last professional match.
  Nicholas Monroe (born April 12, 1982 in Oklahoma City, Oklahoma, U.S.) joined the professional tour in 2004 and reached a career-high doubles ranking of No. 30 in 2017. He won four ATP doubles titles, all of which were at ATP 250 tournaments. Monroe announced his retirement in August ahead of the 2022 US Open and explained it would be his final professional tournament.
   Frederik Nielsen  (born 27 August 1983 in Lyngby, Denmark) joined the professional tour in 2001 and won the 2012 Wimbledon doubles title, as well as two other ATP doubles titles. He played his last match at the Davis Cup in September 2022.
  Kei Nishikori became inactive after last playing at the 2021 Indian Wells Masters.
  Sam Querrey (born October 7, 1987 San Francisco, California, U.S.) joined the professional tour in 2006 and reached a career-high singles ranking of No. 11 in 2018 and doubles ranking of No. 23 in 2010. He won ten singles titles, including two ATP 500 titles in Memphis and Acapulco, and five doubles titles, including one ATP Masters 1000 title in Rome. He announced his retirement on August 30 and played his last matches in singles and doubles at the US Open.
  Milos Raonic became inactive after last playing at the 2021 Atlanta tournament.
  Stéphane Robert (born 17 May 1980 in Montargis, France) joined the professional tour in 2001 and won one ATP doubles title.

  Tommy Robredo (born 1 May 1982 in Hostalric, Spain) joined the professional tour in 1998 and reached a career-high ranking of No. 5 in singles, in August 2006 and of No. 16 in doubles, in April 2009. In singles, he won twelve titles, including the 2006 Hamburg Masters. He also won the Davis Cup three times (in 2004, 2008 and 2009). In doubles, he won five titles, including the 2018 Monte-Carlo Masters, and reached the semifinals of the US Open three times (in 2004, 2008 and 2010). His final tournament was at the Barcelona Open, where he made his ATP Tour debut 23 years prior.
  Dudi Sela (born 4 April 1985 in Tel Aviv, Israel) turned pro in 2002 and won one ATP doubles title. He announced his plans in January to retire after the 2022 season.
  Andreas Seppi (born 21 February 1984 in Bolzano, Italy) joined the professional tour in 2002 and reached a career-high ranking of No. 18 in singles, in January 2013. He has been Italy's No. 1 for 215 weeks. He won 3 singles titles, being the first Italian winning a tournament on grass. He has a record of 66 consecutive appearances in the Grand Slam tournaments (the third highest number ever reached by any male tennis player). He has announced he will retire after the Challenger in Ortisei, his hometown.
  Gilles Simon (born 27 December 1984 in Nice, France) joined the professional tour in 2002 and reached a career-high ranking of No. 6 in singles, in January 2009. He won 14 singles titles, and reached the finals of the Madrid Masters in 2008 (lost to Andy Murray) and the Shanghai Masters in 2014 (lost to Roger Federer). He announced his retirement at the end of the season.
  Ken Skupski (born 9 April 1983 in Liverpool, England, United Kingdom) joined the professional tour in 2001 and won seven ATP doubles titles. He announced his retirement after Wimbledon where he played his last match on 4 July 2022.
  Bruno Soares (born 27 February 1982 in Belo Horizonte, Brazil) turned pro in 2001 and won 35 ATP doubles titles, including the Australian Open and the US Open, as well as three mixed doubles titles. He played his last match at the 2022 US Open with Jamie Murray.
  Sergiy Stakhovsky (born 6 January 1986 in Kyiv, Ukrainian SSR, Soviet Union) joined the professional tour in 2003 and reached a career-high ranking of No. 31 in singles, in September 2010 and of No. 33 in doubles, in June 2011. He won four titles in singles and four titles in doubles. He played his last match at the Australian Open qualifying draw.
  Horia Tecău (born 19 January 1985 in Constanța, Romania), former World No. 2 in doubles, won 38 doubles titles. The 36-year-old Romanian won 20 trophies with Jean-Julien Rojer and the pair finished 2015 as the year-end No. 1 team and Nitto ATP Finals champions. Together, they won the 2015 Wimbledon and 2017 US Open crowns. Tecău played his last match at the 2021 ATP Finals before his retirement on 18 November 2021. He made a brief comeback at the 2022 Davis Cup Qualifying Round with Marius Copil, where they won their match against Spain.

  Jo-Wilfried Tsonga (born 17 April 1985 in Le Mans, France) joined the professional tour in 2004 and reached a career-high ranking of No. 5 in singles, in February 2012, and of No. 33 in doubles, in October 2009. In singles, he won eighteen titles, including the 2008 Paris Masters and the 2014 Canadian Open, while also reaching the final of the 2008 Australian Open (lost to Novak Djokovic) and the 2011 ATP Finals (lost to Roger Federer). He also helped France to win the Davis Cup in 2017. In doubles, Tsonga won four titles, including the 2009 Shanghai Masters (partnered with Julien Benneteau). He retired after his final tournament at the French Open, where he lost in the first round.
  Nenad Zimonjić  (born 4 June 1975 in Belgrade, Yugoslavia, (now Serbia)) joined the professional tour in 1995 and reached a career-high ranking of No. 176 in singles, in March 1999, and of No. 1 in doubles, in November 2008. He won 54 titles in doubles, including 3 major titles. He also won 5 major titles in mixed doubles. With Serbia he won 2010 Davis Cup as a player and 2020 ATP Cup as a captain. He played his last match in doubles at the 2021 Dubai.

Comebacks
The following is a list of notable players (winners of a main tour title, and/or part of the ATP rankings top 100 in singles, or top 100 in doubles, for at least one week) who returned from retirement during the 2022 season:

  Xavier Malisse
  Hyeon Chung

See also 

 2022 ATP Challenger Tour
 2022 ITF Men's World Tennis Tour
 2022 WTA Tour
 International Tennis Federation
 Current tennis rankings

Notes

References

External links 
 Association of Tennis Professionals (ATP) Tour official website
 International Tennis Federation (ITF) official website

 
ATP Tour seasons
ATP